Clarke Thomas Reed (born 1928) is an American businessman and politician from Greenville, Mississippi, who was from 1966 to 1976 the state chairman of the  Mississippi Republican Party. Reed was instrumental in the nomination of U.S. President Gerald Ford, at the 1976 Republican National Convention held in Kansas City, Missouri.

Reed was the father of writer Julia Evans Reed.

References

1928 births
Living people
People from Caruthersville, Missouri
University of Missouri alumni
Politicians from Greenville, Mississippi
Mississippi Republicans
Mississippi State Republican chairmen
Businesspeople from Mississippi
American Presbyterians